Belenois, commonly called the caper whites, is a genus of butterflies of the subfamily Pierini in the family Pieridae that are found in mainly in Africa and south-west Asia.

Species

Subgenus Anaphaeis Hübner, 1819:
Belenois aurota (Fabricius, 1793) – brown-veined white, African caper white, or pioneer white
Belenois creona (Cramer, 1776) – African common white or African caper 
Belenois gidica (Godart, 1819) – African veined white or pointed caper

Species group pseudohuphina:
Belenois margaritacea Sharpe, 1891 – Margarita's caper white
Belenois raffrayi (Oberthür, 1878) – Raffray's white

Group Incertae sedis:
Belenois albomaculatus (Goeze, 1779)
Belenois aldabrensis (Holland, 1896)
Belenois anomala (Butler, 1881)
Belenois antsianaka (Ward, 1870)
Belenois calypso (Drury, 1773) – Calypso caper white 
Belenois crawshayi Butler, 1894 – Crawshay's caper white
Belenois diminuta Butler, 1894
Belenois grandidieri (Mabille, 1878)
Belenois hedyle (Cramer, 1777)
Belenois helcida (Boisduval, 1833)
Belenois java (Linnaeus, 1768) – caper white
Belenois larima (Boisduval, 1836)
Belenois mabella Grose-Smith, 1891
Belenois ogygia (Trimen, 1883)
Belenois rubrosignata (Weymer, 1901) – red-edged white
Belenois solilucis Butler, 1874
Belenois subeida (C. & R. Felder, 1865)
Belenois sudanensis (Talbot, 1929) – Sudan caper white
Belenois theora (Doubleday, 1846)
Belenois theuszi Dewitz, 1889
Belenois thysa (Hopffer, 1855) – false dotted border
Belenois victoria (Dixey, 1915) – Victoria white
Belenois welwitschii Rogenhofer, 1890
Belenois zochalia (Boisduval, 1836) – forest white or forest caper white

References

Pierini
Pieridae genera
Taxa named by Jacob Hübner